Carlos Ramírez may refer to:

Footballers
Carlos Ramírez (futsal player), Mexican futsal player 2012 FIFA Futsal World Cup squads
Carlos Ramírez (Paraguayan footballer), 1926 South American Championship
Carlos Ramírez (Chilean footballer), 1987 FIFA World Youth Championship squads
Carlos Ramírez (footballer, born 1987), Uruguayan footballer playing in Costa Rica 
Carlos Ramírez (Colombian footballer) (born 1988), Colombian footballer 
Carlos Ramírez (Mexican footballer) (born 1976), for Tigres UANL

Other sportsmen
Carlos Ramírez (baseball), Dominican baseball player
Carlos Ramírez (BMX rider) (born 1994), Colombian BMX cyclist
Carlos Ramírez (judoka) (born 1970), Salvadoran judoka
Carlos Ramírez (road cyclist) (born 1994), Colombian road racing cyclist
Carlos Ramírez (volleyball), Puerto Rican volleyball player, Colegio Católico Notre Dame
Carlos Ramírez (wrestler), Venezuelan wrestler in Wrestling at the 2007 Pan American Games

Other uses
Carlos Ramírez (singer) (1916–1986), Colombian singer and actor
Carlos Betances Ramírez (1910–2001), only Puerto Rican to command a battalion in the Korean War
Carlos D. Ramirez (1946–1999), American publisher
Carlos María Ramírez (1847–1898), Uruguayan journalist, essayist and politician
Carlos Ramirez (actor) (born 1973), American actor in The Falling (1987 film)
Carlos Ramirez (born 1989/90), artist of trollface